Droid is the self-titled debut album from groove metal band Droid.  Released on James "Munky" Shaffer's independent record label Emotional Syphon Records it features guest vocals from Deftones frontman Chino Moreno.

Track listing 
 "The Resurrection" - 4:44
 "Fueled by Hate" - 3:53
 "God of Anger" - 4:47
 "Built to Last" - 3:52
 "No Gods No Masters" - 3:23
 "Withdrawals of Me" - 4:08
 "Vengeance Is Mine" (feat. Chino Moreno) - 3:52
 "For the Following" - 2:35
 "Behind Dead Eyes" - 3:31
 "Salt the Graves" - 3:33
 "Together We Die" - 3:48
 "My Oath" - 3:56

References

2007 debut albums
Droid (band) albums